Bartłomiej Fogler (born 7 February 1985) is a Polish footballer who plays for English club AFC Petersfield, as a goalkeeper.

Club career
Fogler began his career in his native Poland, beginning his senior career at hometown club Polonia Warsaw. Fogler made two first team appearances for the club, before departing for Świt Nowy Dwór Mazowiecki.

In July 2010, Fogler joined English club Crewe Alexandra on a monthly rolling contract. In December 2010, Fogler signed a contract until the end of the season. Fogler left the club at the end of the season, having not made an appearance for the club.

On 14 October 2011, Fogler signed for Welsh Premier League club Port Talbot Town after an injury to regular goalkeeper Kristian Rogers. In January 2012, following the return of Rogers to the Port Talbot starting line-up, Fogler was loaned to Bridgend Street until the end of the season.

In 2012, Fogler returned to England, to sign for Wembley.

In 2016, Fogler joined PFC Victoria London, a club for the Polish community in the United Kingdom.

International career
Fogler represented Poland internationally at numerous youth levels.

References

1985 births
Living people
Polish footballers
Poland youth international footballers
Poland under-21 international footballers
Expatriate footballers in England
Expatriate footballers in Wales
Footballers from Warsaw
Association football goalkeepers
Polish expatriate footballers
Polonia Warsaw players
Świt Nowy Dwór Mazowiecki players
Crewe Alexandra F.C. players
Port Talbot Town F.C. players
Wembley F.C. players
Ekstraklasa players
I liga players
Cymru Premier players
Polish expatriate sportspeople in England
PFC Victoria London players